= Alam Serada =

Township in Malaysia

Alam Serada عالم سرادا
- Township
- Location in Terengganu, Malaysia
- Coordinates: 5°14′06″N 103°03′16″E
- Country: Malaysia
- State: Terengganu
- District: Kuala Terengganu

Area
  - Total: 2 km^{2} (0.77 sq mi)

Population
  - Total: 3,500
  - Density: 1,800/km^{2} (4,500/sq mi)
- Postal code: 21000

Alam Serada (Jawi: عالم سرادا) is a township in Kuala Terengganu, Terengganu, Malaysia.
